Atsunobu (written: 厚信 or 篤信) is a masculine Japanese given name. Notable people with the name include:

, Japanese nobleman and writer
, Japanese sprint canoeist
, Japanese international relations scholar

Fictional characters
, a character in the anime series Full Metal Panic? Fumoffu

Japanese masculine given names